Veletiny is a municipality and village in Uherské Hradiště District in the Zlín Region of the Czech Republic. It has about 500 inhabitants.

Sights

A locality called Veletiny-Stará hora is known for the vineyard buildings of folk architecture – búdy, which are above-ground cellars and presses. The area is protected by law as a village monument reservation.

References

Villages in Uherské Hradiště District
Moravian Slovakia